Schlumberger is a surname. Notable people with the surname include:
Schlumberger brothers — Conrad (1878–1936) and Marcel (1884–1953) Schlumberger — founded the Société de Prospection Electrique that later became Schlumberger Limited
Schlumberger array, a type of array used in electrical resistivity tomography, pioneered by the Schlumberger brothers
Charles Schlumberger (1825–1905), French paleontologist known for his studies of Foraminifera
Daniel Schlumberger (1905–1972), French archaeologist
Gustave Schlumberger (1844–1929), French historian and numismatist who specialised in the era of the crusades
Jean Schlumberger (writer) (1877–1968), French writer, brother of Conrad and Marcel, journalist and co-founder of the Nouvelle Revue Française
Jean Schlumberger (jewelry designer) (1907–1987), French jewelry designer for Tiffany & Co.
Liesbeth Schlumberger, organist from South Africa
Marguerite Schlumberger, (1853–1924) French women's suffrage advocate
Robert Schlumberger von Goldeck (1814–1879), Austrian producer of sparkling wine
Thorsten Schlumberger (born 1960), German footballer
William Schlumberger (1800–1838), French chess player of the 19th century

German-language surnames